The 1939 Campeonato Paulista da Primeira Divisão, organized by the LFESP (Liga de Futebol do Estado de São Paulo), was the 38th season of São Paulo's top professional football league. Corinthians won the title for the 11th time. no teams were relegated and the top scorer was Corinthians's Teleco with 32 goals.

Championship
The championship was disputed in a double-round robin system, with the team with the most points winning the title.

References

Campeonato Paulista seasons
Paulista